Acallomyces is a genus of fungi in the family Laboulbeniaceae. The genus contain three species.

See also
List of Laboulbeniaceae genera

References

Laboulbeniales genera
Laboulbeniomycetes